Hipwell is an English surname. Notable people with the surname include:
Cynthia Hipwell, American mechanical engineer
James Hipwell, British journalist, formerly with the Daily Mirror
John Hipwell, Australian rugby union player
John Hipwell (architect) (1920–2007), Australian architect
Mike Hipwell, Ireland rugby union player